Evangelia Tsagka (born June 30, 1987) is a Greek former swimmer, who specialized in freestyle events. She is a single-time Olympian (2004), and a silver medalist in the freestyle relay at the 2001 Mediterranean Games in Tunis, Tunisia (8:16.14).

Tsagka qualified for the women's 4×200 m freestyle relay, as a member of the host nation's team, at the 2004 Summer Olympics in Athens. Teaming with Zoi Dimoschaki, Marianna Lymperta, and Georgia Manoli in heat one, Tsagka swam a third leg and recorded a split of 2:05.99. She and her fellow Greeks rounded out an eight-team field to last place and fifteenth overall in a final time of 8:16.69.

References

External links
2004 Olympic Profile – Eideisis Ellinika 

1987 births
Living people
Greek female swimmers
Olympic swimmers of Greece
Swimmers at the 2004 Summer Olympics
Greek female freestyle swimmers
Swimmers from Athens

Mediterranean Games silver medalists for Greece
Swimmers at the 2001 Mediterranean Games
Mediterranean Games medalists in swimming